Robert Johnson (1911–1938) was an American blues singer and guitarist.

Robert Johnson may also refer to:

Arts
Robert Johnson (artist) (1770–1796), English artist, pupil of Thomas Bewick
Robert Barbour Johnson (1907–1987), artist and writer of weird fiction
Robert Flynn Johnson, curator emeritus at the Fine Arts Museums of San Francisco
Bob Johnson (actor) (1920–1993), voice actor noted for Mission: Impossible mission messages
Bob J (Robert Kwame Johnson), Ghanaian cinematographer. 
Robert Johnson (born 1948), British comic entertainer known under the stage name Bob Carolgees

Musicians
Robert Johnson (Scottish composer) (c. 1470–after 1554), Scottish renaissance composer and priest
Robert Johnson (English composer) (c. 1583–1633), English lutenist and composer
Robert Sherlaw Johnson (1932–2000), British composer, pianist and music scholar
Robert A. Johnson (musician), 1970s Memphis-based guitarist
Robert Johnson (drummer), former drummer for KC and the Sunshine Band
Robert White Johnson, Nashville songwriter

Business
Bob Johnson (butcher) (Robert Alan Johnson, 1940–2001), English businessman
Robert E. Johnson (editor) (1922–1996), publisher and editor of JET magazine
Robert L. Johnson (born 1946), American media entrepreneur, founder of Black Entertainment Television (BET)
Robert M. Johnson (born 1945), publisher of Newsday
Robert Wood Johnson I (1845–1910), founded Johnson & Johnson
Robert Wood Johnson II (1893–1968), 3rd president of Johnson & Johnson
Robert Wood Johnson III (1920–1970), 3rd generation president of Johnson & Johnson
Woody Johnson (Robert Wood Johnson IV, born 1947), American businessman

Military
Robert Johnson (Civil War) (1834–1869), Civil War Brigadier General and secretary to the President of the United States
Robert S. Johnson (1920–1998), American World War II flying ace
Robert Lee Johnson (spy) (1922–1972), American spy for the Soviet Union
Robert Gibbon Johnson (1771–1850), New Jersey colonel, farmer, historian and politician

Politics and law

U.S.
Robert Johnson (governor) (1682–1735), governor of South Carolina
Robert Johnson (Louisiana politician) (born 1975), Louisiana House of Representatives 
Robert Johnson III (born 1958), Mississippi House of Representatives 
Robert A. Johnson (South Dakota politician) (1921–2014), South Dakota State Senate
Robert Davis Johnson (1883–1961), U.S. congressman from Missouri
Robert E. Johnson (New York politician) (1909–1995), New York State Senate
Robert E. Johnson (Colorado politician), state legislator
Robert George Johnson (1925–1969), Minnesota state senator
Robert H. Johnson (1916–2011), Wyoming state senator; see University of Wyoming College of Law
Robert I. Johnson (born 1928), Wisconsin State Assembly
Robert M. Johnson (politician), Florida House of Representatives
Robert T. Johnson (politician) (born 1945), Missouri House of Representatives
Robert Underwood Johnson (1853–1937), U.S. writer and diplomat
Robert W. Johnson (Minnesota politician) (1924–2013), Minnesota House of Representatives 
Robert Ward Johnson (1814–1879), U.S. representative, U.S. senator, and Confederate States senator from Arkansas
Robert T. Johnson (lawyer) (born 1948), justice of the New York State Supreme Court
Robert Johnson (Judge) Circuit court judge for Douglas County, Oregon.

Elsewhere
Robert Johnson (English politician) (c. 1537–1622), English politician who sat in the House of Commons, 1597–1614
Robert Johnson (died 1730), Irish MP for Trim and Athboy
Robert Johnson (died 1721), Irish MP for Athboy and Harristown
Robert Johnson (1745–1833), Irish MP for Hillsborough and Philipstown
Robert Johnson (Australian politician) (1812–1866), New South Wales politician
Robert Milton Johnson (1879–1943), Progressive party member of the Canadian House of Commons

Religion
Robert Johnson (martyr) (died 1582), Catholic priest
Robert Johnson (Archdeacon of Leicester) (1540–1625), Puritan rector
Robert Johnson (bishop) (died 1767), Anglican bishop of Cloyne, 1759–1767
Robert Carroll Johnson Jr. (1938–2014), bishop of North Carolina in The Episcopal Church
Robert Hodges Johnson (fl 1989), bishop of Western North Carolina in The Episcopal Church
Robert J. Johnson (priest), American Roman Catholic priest

Science and academia
Robert Johnson (economist), American economist
Robert Johnson (historian), professor at the University of Toronto
Robert A. Johnson (psychotherapist) (born 1921), American author and Jungian analyst
Robert David Johnson (born 1967), known as KC Johnson, professor of history
Robert E. Johnson (scientist), American mathematician, engineer and physicist
Robert Erwin Johnson (1923–2008), University of Alabama professor, historian of the U.S. Navy and Coast Guard
Robert Livingston Johnson, Temple University president and former vice president of Time Inc
Robert Royce Johnson (1928–2016), engineer, computer pioneer, and professor; inventor of the Johnson counter
Robert Walter Johnson (1899–1971), American physician

Sports
Robert Johnson (handballer) (born 1951), Canadian handball player who competed at the 1976 Summer Olympics
Robert Johnson (tight end) (born 1980), American football player (NFL tight end)
Robert Johnson (safety) (born 1987), American football player (NFL safety for the Tennessee Titans)
Robert Johnson (wide receiver) (born 1982), American football player
Robert Johnson (runner), 1981 USA marathon champion
Robert Johnson (basketball) (born 1995), American basketball player

Others
Sir Robert Johnson (civil servant) (1874–1938), British civil servant, Deputy Master of the Royal Mint, 1922–1938
Robert Johnson (prison officer) (born 1953), American air force veteran and former prison guard
Robert Crawford Johnson (1882–1937), English inventor of the Cube teapot
Robert R. Johnson (1928–2010), co-owner of the racehorse Timoleon
Robert Johnson (1834-1869), son of U.S. president Andrew Johnson

Other uses
"Robert Johnson", a song by Alexis Korner from The Party Album

See also

First name variations
Bert Johnson (disambiguation)
Bob Johnson (disambiguation)
Bobby Johnson (born 1951), college football coach
Rob Johnson (disambiguation)
Robb Johnson (born 1955), British musician

Surname variations
Robert Johnston (disambiguation)

Other
Robert Wood Johnson Foundation
Robert Wood Johnson Medical School
Robert Wood Johnson University Hospital
The Robert Johnson Songbook, a 1998 album by the Peter Green Splinter Group